The Canadian Methodist Mission (CMM), also known as Missionary Society of the Methodist Church in Canada (MCC; ; former romanization: Mei Dao Hwei; also known as Ying Mei Hui []), was a Canadian Methodist Christian missionary society mostly working in the province of Szechwan, which was also referred to as "West China."

History 

In February 1892, eight members of the mission society led by Hart reached Szechwan. Work began in Chengtu and, two years later, in Kiatingfu, with the establishment of mission stations in both cities.

After 1900, eight more mission stations were established in Jenshow (1905), Junghsien (1905), Penghsien (1907), Tzeliutsing (1907), Luchow (1908), Chungking (1910), Chungchow (1911) and Fowchow (1913).

The CMM established its own printing house, Canadian Methodist Mission Press, in Kiatingfu in 1897. In 1903, it was moved to the capital city of Chengtu. This press was responsible for the printing of The West China Missionary News, first in 1899. It was the first English newspaper and the longest running journal in the province of Szechwan.

The CMM was one of the four mission societies responsible for the creation of West China Union University in 1910. By 1922, the Methodists enrolled almost one half of the Protestant Christians in Szechwan.

Following the merger of the Methodist Church of Canada into the United Church of Canada in 1925, the latter assumed responsibility for the CMM. At that time, the CMM was the largest mission of the newly-founded Church.

By 1934, the CMM had joined the Church of Christ in China (CCC); an annual general meeting of the CCC's Szechwan Association was held on 9 February 1939.

Gallery

See also 
 Anglican Diocese of Szechwan
 American Methodist Episcopal Mission

References

Bibliography